Uilliam Ó Duinnín (fl. 1670–1682) was an Irish scribe.

The son of Domhnall Óg Ó Duinnín, Uilliam was the owner of MS 1336, which he may have sold to Edward Lhuyd. He transcribed William Bedell's Irish Old Testament, which was published in 1685.

See also
Tadhg Og Ó Cianáin
Peregrine Ó Duibhgeannáin
Lughaidh Ó Cléirigh
Mícheál Ó Cléirigh
Geoffrey Keating
James Ussher
Sir James Ware
Mary Bonaventure Browne
Dubhaltach Mac Fhirbhisigh
Ruaidhrí Ó Flaithbheartaigh
Seán Ó Catháin
Charles O'Conor (historian)
Eugene O'Curry
John O'Donovan (scholar)

References

Sources
The Manuscript Collection of Dubhaltach MacFhirbhisigh, William O'Sullivan, p. 339–347, in Seanchas: Studies in Early and Medieval Irish Archaeology, History and Literature in Honour of Francis J. Byrne, edited by Alfred P. Smyth. Dublin, Four Courts, 1999. 

17th-century births
17th-century Irish writers
Irish book and manuscript collectors
Irish writers
Place of birth unknown
Place of death unknown
Year of birth unknown
Year of death unknown
Irish-language writers